Travellers Fare (normally rendered officially as Travellers-Fare) was a company owned by British Rail that provided catering services on the rail network in Great Britain.

History
Prior to 1973, railway hotels and catering came under British Transport Hotels, formed in 1962. In the late 1970s, BR's Shipping and International Services Division became Sealink UK from January 1979. In 1982 Travellers-Fare formally left BTH, having been the Travellers-Fare Division of BTH since 1 October 1973. It had been known as British Rail Catering until then. The peak of British rail catering had come in 1973 when 3.5 million meals were served. Quicker journey times meant less time to consume a full meal. In 1979 it celebrated a centenary of railway catering.

In the mid-1970s they were selling around two and a quarter million sandwiches a year. In 1977 its offerings were reprimanded by the Central Transport Consultative Committee, and that same year Prue Leith, a restaurateur and caterer, became the first woman appointed to the British Railways Board, charged with improving its much-criticised catering. In February 1978 they introduced the Gold Star Menu for businessmen on InterCity services, which featured poached haddock and grilled salmon maître d'hôtel. It offered a fixed four-course meal for around £5, and replaced the former table d'hôte service. The Great British Breakfast in the morning sold for £2.70 in 1978, and by 1984 it cost £7.30.

Innovations
In the early 1980s, under improved management, the standard of food became more diverse. New brands were introduced such as Quicksnack. Turnover at stations increased 61% from £46m in 1982 to £74m in 1987. Before 1985 operating losses at stations were averaging around £4m a year, which from 1985 became surpluses. Although the station catering was turning a profit, the catering on board the trains was not, and operating losses for these were around £6m a year in the mid-1980s. In May 1986, catering on-board trains became the responsibility of InterCity and not Travellers-Fare, which had a wider range of food from the buffet car.

The brand did not have enough penetration to sell on the trains; its on-board full (cooked) breakfasts had a lot of popularity nonetheless (around 500,000 a year in the 1980s) in the dining car (first class). The British Rail sandwich was not a big seller on trains.

Private ownership
By 1986 the private sector was running the catering at 85 stations. Standards were improving under private ownership, which led to 96 more stations being put under private operation in 1987.

As a precursor to the privatisation of British Rail, the company was sold to a management buyout team backed by 3i in December 1988. It had been bought for £12.5m, and had 270 outlets and around 3,200 employees. Travellers Fare Ltd (2184010) had been formed on 27 October 1987.

It was subsequently acquired in November 1992 by Compass Group for £31.7m, who merged it with their airport, retail and leisure businesses to form Select Service Partner (SSP) in 1997. It stopped trading as Travellers Fare on 4 March 1997. Compass sold SSP to two consortia led by EQT Partners and Macquarie Bank in 2006 for £1.8bn.

References

 British Rail 1974-1997: From Integration to Privatisation, page 251
 England Eats Out: A Social History of Eating Out in England from 1830 to the Present

1973 establishments in the United Kingdom
1973 in rail transport
British Rail brands
British Rail subsidiaries and divisions
Catering and food service companies of the United Kingdom
Companies based in the London Borough of Camden
Rail catering
Restaurants established in 1973
SSP Group
3i Group companies